
Cololo Lake (Spanish: Laguna Cololo) is a lake in the Apolobamba mountain range in the La Paz Department in Bolivia. It is situated in the Antaquilla de Copacabana Canton of the Pelechuco Municipality in the Franz Tamayo Province at an elevation of 4,538 m at a distance of about 20 km north west from the Cololo mountain. Its surface area is 5.2 km².

See also 
 Machu Such'i Qhuchi
 Jach'a Waracha
 Wanakuni

References 
 Pelechuco Municipality: population data and map

Lakes of La Paz Department (Bolivia)